East Kilbride West is one of the 20 electoral wards of South Lanarkshire Council. Created in 2007, the ward elects three councillors using the single transferable vote electoral system and covers an area with a population of 15,275 people.

The ward has produced strong results for both Labour and the Scottish National Party (SNP) with the former holding two of the three seats from 2007 to 2012 and the latter holding two between 2012 and 2017. It is the only ward in South Lanarkshire to have returned a Green councillor.

Boundaries
The ward was created following the Fourth Statutory Reviews of Electoral Arrangements ahead of the 2007 Scottish local elections. As a result of the Local Governance (Scotland) Act 2004, local elections in Scotland would use the single transferable vote electoral system from 2007 onwards so East Kilbride East was formed from an amalgamation of several previous first-past-the-post wards. It contained the vast majority of the former Calderglen and Long Calderwood wards as well as all of the former Morrishall ward. As a result of amendments to the boundaries of the South Lanarkshire Council's management areas, the boundaries between Rutherglen and Cambuslang, East Kilbride and Hamilton were tweaked so East Kilbride East also contained part of the former Cairns ward. East Kilbride East covers the parts of East Kilbride on the north-east and eastern peripheries of the town, primarily Calderwood (excepting the Maxwellton/west of Calderwood Road area), as well as Brancumhall, part of St Leonards (east of High Common Road), Nerston (the separate hamlet, but not the brownfield residential developments south of Kingsgate) and the Crutherland development fringing Calderglen Country Park. Following the Fifth Statutory Reviews of Electoral Arrangements ahead of the 2017 Scottish local elections, streets between Calderwood Road, Morrishall Road and Hunter Primary School were transferred into the ward from East Kilbride Central North.

Councillors

Election Results

2022 election

2017 Election

2012 Election

2007 Election

Notes

References

Wards of South Lanarkshire
East Kilbride